Rouse Rocks may refer to:

 Rouse Islands, a small group of islands in the eastern part of Holme Bay in Antarctica
 Rouse Rocks, an alternate name for John T. Young's sculpture Soaring Stones